Bizhanvand (also Romanized as Bīzhanvand; also known as Nūr Moḥammad Khān) is a village in Teshkan Rural District, Chegeni District, Dowreh County, Lorestan Province, Iran. At the 2006 census, its population was 232, in 55 families.

References 

Towns and villages in Dowreh County